Zammuto is an American indie rock band, formed in Readsboro, Vermont, United States, in 2011. In April 2012, Zammuto released their debut album, Zammuto, with the Brooklyn, New York-based record label, Temporary Residence Limited.

Nick Zammuto, the founder of the band, was once part of the duo The Books. After their collaboration ended in 2011, Nick Zammuto began the next phase of his musical career.

Zammuto has toured as a support act for Explosions in the Sky and Gotye, as well as headlining tours in the United States, Canada, and Europe with the bands AU, Snowblink, and Lymbyc Systym, among other acts.

History

The Books
Nick Zammuto had been making critically acclaimed music starting in the year 2001 as a member of the band The Books. From 2001 through 2010, The Books released four studio albums.

The albums are Thought for Food (2002), The Lemon of Pink (2003), Lost and Safe (2005), and The Way Out (2010). The first three albums were released under the Tomlab label, and the fourth album was released under Temporary Residence LTD. The Books also released 2 DVDs of videos, and an EP called Music for a French Elevator and Other Short Format Oddities by the Books during this time.

Upon the dissolution of his first band, Nick Zammuto stated in an interview on Pitchfork that "it was a scramble for me to figure out what to do next. I seriously considered just stopping music since it's such an uncertain business and hard on my family, but my wife and close friends urged me to make another record right away. It definitely had a 'do or die' kind of feeling hanging over it."

Idiom Wind EP
While working on their first album in the year 2011, Zammuto released a three-song EP composed of songs which were to appear on their forthcoming album. This record was called the Idiom Wind EP and was released by a London-based record label called Make Mine Records. It contained the songs "Idiom Wind", "F U C-3PO", and "Weird Ceiling". "F U C-3PO" was named as "best new track" by Pitchfork Media.

First album
On April 3, 2012, Zammuto released their self-titled first full-length album, under Temporary Residence LTD. The album received a wide variety of critical response, scoring an overall rating of 76 on Metacritic and a rating of 8.0 on Pitchfork Media.

Live show and touring
Immediately following the release of their first album, Zammuto toured extensively during 2012, playing more than 80 shows throughout the United States, Canada, and Europe. They began touring as an opening act for their label-mate, Explosions in the Sky. In the fall of 2012, they began a nationwide headlining tour through North America, mixed in with a few opening acts for the Australian band Gotye. They ended their intense touring in the spring of 2013 with a small North American tour with the Canadian band Snowblink.

Nick Zammuto did an interview explaining the process of preparing for their live shows. "My studio is a tractor garage that, from the outside, is just a shack but you go inside and it's state-of-the-art equipment and I love that tension. It's really funny and it's great because I have my band out from New York City and they view it as a haven. We just work with total focus and get a lot done and then we can all go back to our normal lives afterwards. It's always a beautiful moment to have them up."

Second album
In the summer of 2013, Zammuto announced they were working on a second album. In order to generate funds for the completion of their second album, the band participated in a crowd funding effort on Indiegogo, which received overwhelming support by the fans, collecting 350% of their original goal. During the fundraiser, the band released three new songs, "Sinker", "Need Some Sun", and "Corduroys" The album, Anchor, was released on September 2, 2014, under the label Temporary Residence Limited.

Band members
Current
Nick Zammuto  - vocals, electric guitar, Moog synth, laptop (2011–present)
Sean Dixon - drums, drum pad (2011–present)
Mikey Zammuto - bass (2011–present)
Nick Oddy - electric guitar, keyboards (2013–present)

Former
Gene Back - electric guitar, keyboards (2011–2013)

Timeline

Discography

Albums
 Zammuto - 2012, Temporary Residence Limited 
Anchor - 2014, Temporary Residence Limited

EPs
 Idiom Wind - 2011, Make Mine Records
 Veryone - 2016, Temporary Residence Limited

Soundtracks
 We The Animals: An Original Motion Picture Soundtrack - 2018, Soundtrack for the 2018 film We the Animals

Films
A short documentary about the band entitled The Shape of Things to Come was directed and released by Wondermind Pictures, spotlighting the band. This documentary received wide critical acclaim, appearing in numerous film festivals around the United States.

Tours

2012
Three-show tour including MASS MoCA, New York City, and Boston shows
United States supporting tour with Explosions in the Sky
United States and Canada supporting tour with Gotye
United States headlining tour with Lymbyc Systym
West Coast headlining tour with AU
European headlining tour

Festival appearances
Hopscotch Music Festival
Mission Creek Festival
Le Guess Who Festival
Autumn Falls Festival
Transmusicales Festival

2013
United States and Canada headlining tour with Snowblink

References

External links

Indie rock musical groups from Vermont
American electronic music groups
Temporary Residence Limited artists